Angelina "Lina" Merlin (15 October 1887 – 16 August 1979) was an Italian politician, perhaps best known for authoring and promoting the so-called "Merlin law" which abolished state-regulated prostitution in Italy. She was also an activist and educator, and took part in the Italian resistance movement.

The daughter of Giustina Poli, a teacher, and Fruttuoso Merlin, secretary for the municipality, she was born in Pozzonovo, and grew up in Chioggia. In 1907, she received her diploma, qualifying her to teach elementary school. In 1914, she received her qualification to teach French in middle school, but preferred to continue to teach elementary school. In March 1926, because she refused to take an oath of loyalty to Italy's Fascist government, she was removed from her teaching position. In November of that year, she was sentenced to five years in prison; her sentence was reduced, and she returned to Padua in November 1929. She moved to Milan in 1930; to support herself, she gave private lessons in French.

In 1919, she joined the Italian Socialist Party (PSI). Merlin contributed to the socialist weekly Eco dei lavoratori, and the  periodical La Difesa delle lavoratrici. During World War II, she took part in the resistance against the fascists.

In 1946, she was elected to the Constituent Assembly of Italy, as a member of the PSI. She was instrumental in ensuring that the rights of women and children were protected in the new constitution. In 1948, she was elected to the Italian Senate of the Republic; she was re-elected in 1953. Merlin retired from the Socialist Party in 1961, and did not run for re-election after her term of office ended in 1963.

The bill to abolish the regulation of prostitution in Italy (Law No. 75/1958) was introduced in 1948, and, after a long and difficult process, was finally passed in early 1958 and came into effect in September of that year.

Merlin served on the Chioggia municipal council from 1951 to 1955.

She met  in Milan; the couple married in 1933, but Gallani died three years later.

Merlin died in Padua at the age of 91.

References 

1887 births
1979 deaths
Italian resistance movement members
Italian Socialist Party politicians
Members of the Constituent Assembly of Italy
Deputies of Legislature III of Italy
Senators of Legislature I of Italy
Senators of Legislature II of Italy
Italian feminists
Italian socialist feminists
20th-century Italian women politicians
Women members of the Chamber of Deputies (Italy)
Women members of the Senate of the Republic (Italy)